Aldebrandus or Aldebrand, also known as Hildebrand (1119–30 April 1219), was a Bishop of Fossombrone and a saint.

Aldebrandus was almost certainly born at Sorrivoli in the comune of Roncofreddo, Italy. He was educated by the canons of Santa Maria de Porto near Ravenna. After being ordained to the priesthood, he was appointed provost of the chapter of Rimini Cathedral, where his bold preaching against sinful living put him at odds with those in authority. He was threatened with death and forced to flee the area.

In 1170 he was appointed Bishop of Fossombrone, where he later had the cathedral built. His relics are still there.

A miracle attributed to Aldebrandus is that when he was old and bedridden, his servants brought him a cooked partridge, but as it was a fast day he was unable to eat the bird, so prayed over it, whereupon it came to life and flew away.

His feast is celebrated at Fossombrone on 1 May, but at Sorrivoli on the second Sunday of May.

References

Italian Roman Catholic saints
13th-century Christian saints
1219 deaths
1119 births
13th-century Italian Roman Catholic bishops
People from the Province of Forlì-Cesena